Warzone is an album by Yoko Ono released on 24 October 2018, her 50th anniversary as a musician. It consists of 13 songs she picked up and reconstructed from her past albums released from 1970 to 2009. It also includes the newest version of the 1971 song "Imagine" by John Lennon. Since Take Me to the Land of Hell in 2013, this is the Ono's first in five years and 20th original album in total (including collaborations with John Lennon). This includes a bonus track only for Japan. An English-born singer, Anohni listed Warzone as her favorite album of the 2010s.

Interview
The version of "Imagine" included in the album gained attention for adding Ono into the credit as well as John Lennon. Regarding the release, Yoko said, "I was afraid of renewing this song. Tom (Thomas Bartlett, a producer) was also a little bit afraid, I think. People all over the world know this song. However, I decided to carry out because it matches the theme of the album. The world is far too confused. For anyone, things have been so difficult. We are living in the war zone now... I like creation with the new way, because things are changing every day."

Track listing

All songs written by Yoko Ono, except "Imagine" written by John Lennon and Yoko Ono.

The Japanese edition includes an alternate recording of "Midsummer New York", recorded during the original Fly sessions in 1971.

Personnel
Yoko Ono – vocals (all tracks)
Caleb Burhans – violin (2, 5, 9)
Courtney Orlando – violin (2, 5, 9)
Doug Wieselman – bass clarinet (4, 10)
Erik Friedlander – cello (4, 10)
Laura Lutzke – violin (2, 5, 9)
Marc Ribot – acoustic guitar (3), electric guitar (3, 8)
Nico Muhly – string arrangements (2, 5, 9)
Patti Kilroy – violin (2, 5, 9)
Kassa Overall – drums (3, 5, 8)
Thomas Bartlett – bass (5), electronics (1–8, 13), keyboards (1-10, 13), piano (1, 6, 9–10, 12–13)

Animals
Baboon (2)
Crows (1, 7, 8)
Elephant (1, 2, 7)
Monkeys (8)
Panther (2)
Whale (8)
Wolf (1, 7, 8)

Technical
Produced by Yoko Ono and Thomas Bartlett
Recorded by Thomas Bartlett, Chris Allen and Patrick Dillett
Assistant engineers: James Yost, Owen Mulholland and Grant Valentine
Recorded at Reservoir Studios and Sear Sound
Mixed by Chris Allen at Sear Sound
Mastered by Stephen Marcussen at Marcussen Mastering
Album art concept and drawings by Yoko Ono

Credits for "Midsummer New York"
Recorded August 23, 1971 at Ascot Sound Studios and Record Plant, NYC.
Yoko Ono – voice
John Lennon – guitar
Klaus Voormann – bass
Jim Keltner – drums

References

External links 
 Yoko Ono at Sony Music Japan

2018 albums
Yoko Ono albums